Eusapromyza is a genus of small flies of the family Lauxaniidae.

Species
E. balioptera Czerny, 1932
E. beraudi (Bezzi, 1909)
E. martineki Shatalkin, 1998
E. multipunctata (Fallén, 1820)
E. poeciloptera (Loew, 1873)

References

Lauxaniidae
Schizophora genera
Taxa named by John Russell Malloch